Petar Grašo (born 19 March 1976) is a Croatian pop singer and songwriter. Born in Split to basketball player Zoran Grašo, he rose to prominence when Oliver Dragojević performed one of his first songs "Boginja" on the Dora contest in 1995. Since then, he has collaborated greatly with Dragojević, and has also worked with Doris Dragović, Danijela Martinović, Tonči Huljić, Goran Bregović, and Lepa Brena.

In 1996, he won the Zadarfest music festival in Zadar with his song "Trebam nekoga", which promulgated him to wide fame. He placed second in Dora 1997, Croatia's qualifying competition for Eurovision Song Contest 1997. Today, he is one of the most popular male pop singers in Croatia, and is also well known in Serbia, Bosnia and Herzegovina, Slovenia, and North Macedonia.

Grašo co-wrote the lyrics to the song "Metak sa posvetom" with Antonija Šola for Lepa Brena's 2011 album Začarani krug, and composed the music himself.

His songs "Volim i postojim" (1997) and "Ko nam brani?" (1999) are credited with helping the public cope with the COVID-19 pandemic.

In February 2022, he married Hana Huljić.

Discography

Albums
Mjesec iznad oblaka (1997)
Utorak (1999)
Šporke riči (2003)
Best of Petar Grašo Uvertira 1995. – 2005. (2007)

Singles

References

External links

1976 births
Living people
21st-century Croatian male singers
Croatian pop singers
Musicians from Split, Croatia
20th-century Croatian male singers